Hunterdon County is a county located in the western section of the U.S. state of New Jersey. At the 2020 census, the county was the state's 18th-most populous county, with a population of 128,947, its highest decennial count ever and an increase of 598 (+0.5%) from the 2010 census count of 128,349, which in turn reflected an increase of 6,360 (5.2%) from the 121,989 counted in the 2000 census. Its county seat is Flemington.

In 2015, the county had a per capita personal income of $80,759, the third-highest in New Jersey and ranked 33rd of 3,113 counties in the United States. The Bureau of Economic Analysis ranked the county as having the 19th-highest per capita income of all 3,113 counties in the United States (and the highest in New Jersey) as of 2009. Hunterdon County is noted for having the second-lowest level of child poverty of any county in the United States.

Geographically, much of the county lies in the Delaware Valley as a geographic concept, that is, the drainage basin of the Delaware River. Local businesses and the Delaware Valley Regional High School carry the name. However, "Delaware Valley" is also used to refer to the Philadelphia-Reading-Camden Combined Statistical Area (CSA), and Hunterdon County does not belong to the Philadelphia CSA, but rather to the New York-Northern New Jersey-Long Island Metropolitan Statistical Area (MSA), part of the larger New York-Newark Combined Statistical Area (CSA). It is located within the state's Skylands Region and is considered to be a part of Central Jersey.

Hunterdon County was established on March 11, 1714, separating from Burlington County, at which time it included all of present-day Morris, Sussex, and Warren counties. The rolling hills and rich soils which produce bountiful agricultural crops drew Native American tribes and then Europeans to the area.

History

Etymology
Hunterdon County was named for Robert Hunter, a colonial governor of New Jersey. Language changes over time and location, so by stemming of [s], and a [t] → [d] lenition of the name of his family seat of "Hunterston" in Ayrshire, Scotland, the name "Hunterdon" was derived.

Paleo Indians and Native Americans
Paleo Indians moved into Hunterdon County between 12,000 BCE and 11,000 BCE. The area was warming due to climate change.  The Wisconsin Glacier in Warren and Sussex County was retreating northward.  The area was that of Taiga/Boreal forests. Paleo Indians traveled in small groups in search of game and edible plants.  They used spears made of bone, jasper or black chert.  Their camp sites are difficult to find as they are many feet below the present surface.

Native Americans moved into the area but the time they arrived is unknown. Most have come from the Mississippi River area.  Many tribes of the Delaware Nation lived in Hunterdon County especially along the Delaware River and in the Flemington area.  These tribes were agricultural in nature, growing corn, beans and squash.  Those that lived along the South Branch of the Raritan River fished and farmed.  There was a Native American trail that went along the South Branch of the Raritan River (Philhower 1924).

European settlement
Land purchases from Native Americans occurred from 1688 to 1758.  Large land purchases from Native Americans occurred in 1703, 1709 and 1710.  Over  were bought with metal knives and pots, clothing, blankets, barrels of rum or hard cider, guns, powder and shot.  This allowed for European settlers to enter into Hunterdon County in the early 18th century.  After 1760, nearly all Native Americans left New Jersey and relocated to eastern Canada or the Mississippi River area.

The first European settlers were Col. John Reading who settled in Reading Township in 1704 they called him Sir Reading of Readington and John Holcombe who settled in Lambertville in 1705.

Hunterdon County was separated from Burlington County on March 11, 1714.

On March 15, 1739, Morris County (which at the time included what would later become Sussex County and Warren County) was separated from Hunterdon County. The boundary between Hunterdon and Somerset counties is evidence of the old Keith Line which separated the provinces of West Jersey and East Jersey. Hunterdon County was reduced in area on February 22, 1838, with the formation of Mercer County from portions of Burlington County, Hunterdon County and Middlesex County. In February 1839, the remaining portion of Hopewell Township was annexed to Mercer County. On March 13, 1844 Hopewell Township returned to Hunterdon County while Tewksbury Township was annexed by Somerset County but in February 1845 both of these changes were repealed. Since then, the county boundaries have remained the same.

Hunterdon County was being affected by industrialization in the state and nation, mining speculation in northwest New Jersey, and competitors constructing railroads. The Elizabethtown and Somerville Railroad leased a section to White House just south of Tewksbury Township in 1848.

Recent history
Transitioning from rural to suburban, Hunterdon County is an exurb on the western edge of New Jersey and home to commuters to New York City and Philadelphia. The county seat, Flemington, is noted as the site of the Lindbergh kidnapping trial which convicted Bruno Hauptmann of the murder of aviator Charles Lindbergh's son. With growing towns and shopping areas, as well as relaxing rural areas, Hunterdon County is a far stretch from the urban areas stereotypically associated with New Jersey. Due to the presence of natural habitats with many homes in wooded settings, Hunterdon County was recently found to have the third highest case rate of Lyme disease out of all counties in the United States.

On December 24, 2020, The Hunterdon County Library System announced that the library system will be joining the MAIN Library System which covers libraries in Morris County and parts of Somerset and Warren counties, this merger was completed on January 11, 2021.

Geography and geology

Geography

Much of the county is hilly, with several hills rising to one thousand foot in elevation. The first is at Smith on the Morris County line and the second is north of the area called Little Brook. This area is known as the Highlands of New Jersey. The lowest elevation is where the Mercer County line reaches the Delaware River, approximately 50 feet (15 m) above sea level. The county is drained by the Musconetcong River in the north. The river flows in a southwest direction. The Lamington River drains the county in the east. The central portion of the county is drained by the South Branch of the Raritan River. The Delaware River drains the western side of the county.

Geology 
Around 500 million years ago, a chain of volcanic islands shaped like an arch collided with proto North America and rode over the top of the North American plate. The rock from the islands created the highlands of Hunterdon County as there was a shallow sea where Hunterdon County is now located.  Then around four hundred million B.C., a small continent that was long and thin, collided with proto North America. This collision created compression, which caused heat. The Paleozoic sediment of shale and sandstone folded and faulted. The heat allowed the igneous rock to bend, thus Hunterdon County was born.

The African plate which later collided with North America created more folding and faulting, especially in the southern Appalachians.  Then the African and North America plates tore and drifted away from each other.

The Wisconsin glacier that entered into New Jersey around 21,000 BCE and then melted around 13,000 BCE did not reach Hunterdon County. However, there are glacial outwash deposits from streams and rivers that flowed from the glacier southward depositing rock and sediment.

Hunterdon County has two geophysical provinces. The first is the Highlands which is the western section of the county. The other is the Piedmont which is the eastern and southern section of the county. The Highlands account for one-third of the area and Piedmont accounts for two-thirds of the county. The Highlands are part of the Reading Prong. Limestone and shale over igneous rock comprise the Highlands. Piedmont is made up of shale and sandstone.

Climate
Hunterdon has a humid continental climate which is hot-summer (Dfa) except in some higher northern areas where it is warm-summer (Dfb). The hardiness zone is mainly 6b except for some 6a in higher northern areas and 7a along the Delaware River in West Amwell Township. Average monthly temperatures in Clinton range from 29.0 °F in January to 74.0 °F in July, while in Flemington they range from 30.0 °F in January to 74.8 °F in July and in Lambertville they range from 31.1 °F in January to 75.7 °F in July. 

Demographics

2020 Census

2010 Census

Economy
Based on data from the Bureau of Economic Analysis, Hunterdon County had a gross domestic product (GDP) of $6.8 billion in 2018, which was ranked 16th in the state and represented an increase of -0.4% from the previous year.

Hunterdon County ranked as the 19th among the highest-income counties in the United States with a 2010 per capita income of $67,053. It ranks fourth among U.S. counties for household income according to the most recent data from the U.S. Census Bureau. Hunterdon County's median household income was $105,186, behind only Loudoun County and Fairfax County in Virginia, and Howard County, Maryland.

Transportation

Roads and highways

Many important roads pass through the county. They include state routes, such as Route 12, Route 29, Route 31, Route 173 and Route 179. Two U.S. Routes pass through the county, which are U.S. Route 22 and U.S. Route 202. The only limited access road that passes through is Interstate 78.

Public transportation 

Limited rail service to the northern part of the county from Newark Penn Station/Pennsylvania Station is provided to High Bridge, Annandale, Lebanon and Whitehouse Station by NJ Transit's Raritan Valley Line.

The Norfolk Southern Railway's Lehigh Line (formerly the mainline of the Lehigh Valley Railroad), runs through Hunterdon County.

In addition, The Hunterdon County Link operates demand-response service across the county, as well as fixed-route service in Flemington. Trans-Bridge Lines also provides service to the Port Authority Bus Terminal in Midtown Manhattan, as well as several towns/cities west in Pennsylvania. Stops include Clinton, Flemington, Lambertville, and Frenchtown.

Government

County government
Hunterdon County is governed by a Board of County Commissioners comprised of five members who serve three-year terms of office at-large on a staggered basis, with either one or two seats up for election each year on a partisan basis as part of the November general election. At an annual reorganization meeting held each January, the Commissioners select one member to serve as the board's director and another to serve as deputy director. The Commissioner Board is the center of legislative and administrative responsibility and, as such, performs a dual role. As legislators, they draw up and adopt a budget, and in the role of administrators they are responsible for spending the funds they have appropriated. , Hunterdon County's Commissioners are 
Commissioner Director Zachary T. Rich (R; West Amwell Township, term as commissioner ends December 31, 2025; term as director ends 2023),
Deputy Director Jeff Kuhl (R; Raritan Township, elected to serve an unexpired term ending 2024; term as deputy director ends 2023) 
John E. Lanza (R; Raritan Township, 2025),
Susan Soloway (R; Franklin Township, 2024) and 
Shaun C. Van Doren (R; Tewksbury Township, 2023). 

Pursuant to Article VII Section II of the New Jersey State Constitution, each county in New Jersey is required to have three elected administrative officials known as "constitutional officers." These officers are the County Clerk and County Surrogate (both elected for five-year terms of office) and the County Sheriff (elected for a three-year term). Constitutional officers elected on a countywide basis are 
County Clerk Mary H. Melfi (R; Flemington, 2026), 
Sheriff Fredrick W. Brown (R; Alexandria Township, 2025) and
Surrogate Susan J. Hoffman (R; Kingwood Township, 2023).

The Hunterdon County Prosecutor is Renée M. Robeson, who was nominated by Governor of New Jersey Phil Murphy in 2021. Hunterdon County is a part of Vicinage 13 of the New Jersey Superior Court (along with Somerset County and Warren County), which is seated at the Somerset County Courthouse in Somerville, the county seat of Somerset County; the Assignment Judge for Vicinage 15 is Yolanda Ciccone. The Hunterdon County Courthouse is in Flemington.

In June 2022, the commissioners appointed Jeff Kuhl to fill the seat expiring in December 2024 that had been held by Mike Holt until he resigned from office. Kuhl will serve on an interim basis until the November 2022 general election, when voters will choose a candidate to serve the balance of the term of office.

Federal representatives 
Hunterdon County falls entirely within the 7th congressional district.

State representatives 
The 26 municipalities of Hunterdon County are represented by three Separate Legislative Districts.

Law enforcement 
The Hunterdon County Sheriff's Office includes about 43 sworn officers. The current sheriff is Frederick Brown, who was reelected to a second three-year term in 2013. He was preceded by Republican Deborah Trout who served one term starting in November 2007.

On December 22, 2008, state investigators seized computers and other records related to Sheriff Deborah Trout’s hiring of undersheriffs and other personnel without the usual background checks and qualifications.
In 2010, a grand jury indicted then-sheriff Deborah Trout and two under-sheriffs on 43 counts of official misconduct and other charges. The indictment was later suppressed when new state officials were appointed by incoming Governor Chris Christie. The propriety of the investigation, the indictment and its aftermath are the subject of a number of legal actions.

Politics
Hunterdon County is considered a Republican stronghold and has traditionally elected some of the most conservative members of the New Jersey legislature. It has also provided big votes for independent conservative third party candidates opposing liberal and moderate Republicans, particularly in 1997, when 13% of county voters backed two conservative independent candidates against the incumbent Governor Christine Todd Whitman. All five County Commissioners are Republicans, as are all countywide elected officers and the majority of township committee and borough council members. The county has only gone Democratic in a presidential election twice since 1920, in the national Democratic landslides of 1936 and 1964. As of October 1, 2021, there were a total of 107,101 registered voters in Hunterdon County, of whom 29,256 (27.3%) were registered as Democrats, 41,836 (39.1%) were registered as Republicans and 35,077 (32.8%) were registered as unaffiliated. There were 932 voters (0.9%) registered to other parties.

In the 2008 presidential election, Barack Obama defeated John McCain by a 7.2% margin nationally, but Obama defeated McCain in New Jersey by a 15.5% margin. Republican John McCain received 55.5% of the vote (39,092 cast), ahead of Democrat Barack Obama with 42.3% (29,776 votes) and other candidates with 1.4% (981 votes), among the 70,409 ballots cast by the county's 87,460 registered voters, for a turnout of 80.5%. However in 2016, the margin of victory for Republican presidential candidates decreased 17.8 percent in 2012 to 13.7 percent, despite the Democrats national popular vote margin shrinking from 3.9 points to 2.1 points. In 2020, Joe Biden came closer than any Democratic nominee to carrying the county since Lyndon B. Johnson’s win in 1964, losing by 4.4 percent to Donald Trump.

|}

Hunterdon County supported Steve Lonegan for Governor over Chris Christie in the 2009 Republican primary, by a 4.0% margin. Although in the 2009 gubernatorial election, Republican Chris Christie received 64.9% of the vote (33,360 ballots cast), ahead of Democrat Jon Corzine with 25.1% (12,893 votes), Independent Chris Daggett with 8.0% (4,098 votes) and other candidates with 0.8% (387 votes), among the 51,372 ballots cast by the county's 86,186 registered voters, yielding a 59.6% turnout. In the 2013 gubernatorial election, Republican Governor Chris Christie received 73.5% of the vote (31,292 votes) to Democrat Barbara Buono's 24.4% (10,425 votes). In the 2017 gubernatorial election, Democrat Phil Murphy received 39.0% of the vote (17,697 votes) to Republican Kim Guadagno's 58.9% (26,708 votes). In the 2021 gubernatorial election, Democratic Governor Phil Murphy received 40.2% of the vote (22,820 votes) to Republican Jack Ciattarelli's 58.9% (33,459 votes), making it just one of two counties (along with Somerset) to shift to the left in that election.

Municipalities

The following 26 municipalities are located in Hunterdon County (with 2010 Census data for population, housing units and area):

Other unincorporated places
Other unincorporated places within Hunterdon County include:
 Pittstown (within Franklin, Union, and Alexandria)
 Pottersville (within Tewksbury and Bedminster)

Notable people
 Emma Bell (born 1986), actress
 Scott Bradlee (born 1981), musician
 John Whitfield Bunn and Jacob Bunn, industrialists
 Daryl Cobb (born 1961), children's book author.
 Jack Cust (born 1979), MLB player
 Vera Farmiga (born 1973), Academy Award-nominated actress, film director and television producer
 Taissa Farmiga (born 1994), actress
 Wanda Gág (1893–1946), writer
 Elizabeth Gilbert (born 1969), writer
 Troy Glaus (born 1976), MLB player
 Merv Griffin (1925–2007), musician, talk-show host, television producer
 Liver-Eating Johnson ( 1824-1900), mountain man of the American West, on whom the film Jeremiah Johnson is based.
 William Kirkpatrick, (1769–1832), United States Congressman
Stephen Kovacs (1972–2022), saber fencer and fencing coach, charged with sexual assault, died in prison
 Leonard Lance (born 1952), United States Congressman
 James W. Marshall (1810–1885), discoverer of gold at Sutter's Mill in California in 1848 (started the Gold Rush)
 Collin McKinney, Texas independence leader
 Joe Piscopo (born 1951), comedian
 Susan Seidelman (born 1952), film director and producer
 Gary Vaynerchuk (born 1975), Entrepreneur
 Christine Todd Whitman (born 1946), 50th Governor of New Jersey
 Sharon Van Etten (born 1981), singer-songwriter

Education

School districts
School districts include:

K-12
 South Hunterdon Regional School District

Secondary
 Delaware Valley Regional High School
 Hunterdon Central Regional High School
 Hunterdon County Vocational School District
 North Hunterdon-Voorhees Regional High School District

Elementary (K-8, except as noted)

 Alexandria Township School District
 Bethlehem Township School District
 Bloomsbury School District
 Califon School District
 Clinton-Glen Gardner School District (renamed from Clinton Public School as of 2009)
 Clinton Township School District
 Delaware Township School District
 East Amwell Township School District
 Flemington-Raritan Regional School District
 Franklin Township School District (Hunterdon County, New Jersey)
 Frenchtown School District
 Hampton School District
 High Bridge School District
 Holland Township School District
 Kingwood Township School District
 Lebanon Borough School District K–6
 Lebanon Township Schools
 Milford Borough School District
 Readington Township Public Schools
 Tewksbury Township Schools
 Union Township School District

High schools

 Delaware Valley Regional High School, in Alexandria Township, serves the townships of Alexandria, Holland and Kingwood and the boroughs of Frenchtown and Milford.
 Hunterdon Central Regional High School, located in Raritan Township, serves students from Delaware Township, East Amwell Township, Flemington Borough, Raritan Township and Readington Township.
 North Hunterdon High School, located in Clinton Township, hosts the students of Bethlehem Township, Clinton Town, Clinton Township, Franklin Township, Lebanon Borough and Union Township.
 Phillipsburg High School, located in Phillipsburg in neighboring Warren County, educates the students of Bloomsbury, though a proposal is currently on the table to send the borough's students to Delaware Valley Regional High school instead.
 South Hunterdon Regional High School, located in West Amwell Township, serves students from Lambertville, Stockton and West Amwell Township.
 Voorhees High School, in Lebanon Township, serves the students of Califon Borough, Glen Gardner Borough, Hampton Borough, High Bridge Borough, Lebanon Township, Tewksbury Township.

Higher education
 Raritan Valley Community College is the two-year community college for both Hunterdon and Somerset County, one of a network of 19 county colleges statewide. Founded in 1965, the school's main campus is located in North Branch, in Somerset County.
 Rutgers University has a partnership with Raritan Valley Community College which offers bachelor's degree completion programs at the North Branch campus.

Points of interest
Hunterdon County is considered the premier place to hunt white tailed deer in New Jersey.  More deer are harvested each year than any other county according to New Jersey Fish and Game records. The premier fishing streams are the Musconetcong in the north and the Lamington River.  The NJ Fish and Game stocks thousands of rainbow, brown, and brook trout in these streams as well as other streams such as the South Branch of the Raritan River.

Round Valley Reservoir and Spruce Run Reservoir are manmade reservoirs that provide boating and fishing opportunities for patrons. Spruce Run, the state's third-largest reservoir, held the state record for Northern Pike for nearly 30 years, and offers a large variety of species for anglers to pursue. New Jersey Fish and Game has nine Wildlife Management Areas for hunting ducks, deer, pheasants, quail, rabbits, squirrels and bears.

The Hunterdon County Department of Parks and Recreation manages these parks.
 Point Mountain Section
 Mountain Farm/Teetertown Preserve
 Tower Hill Park
 Charlestown Reserve
 Union Furnace Nature Preserve
 Columbia Trail Section
 Cold Brook Reserve
 Musconetcong Gorge  Section
 Schick Reserve
 Hoffman Park
 South Branch Reservation
 Landsdown Trail Section
 Cushetunk Mountain Nature Preserve
 Arboretum
 Deer Path Park and Round Mountain Section
 Uplands Reserve
 Clover Hill Park
 Heron Glen Golf Course
 Wescott Nature Preserve
 South County Park
 Future Park
 Laport Reserve
 Sourland Mountain Nature Preserve
 Jugtown Mountain Nature Preserve
 Finn Road Park
 Beneduce Vineyards
 Hunterdon County Arboretum
 Hunterdon Art Museum
 Hunterdon County Courthouse
 Hunterdon Medical Center
 Mount Salem Vineyards
 Old York Cellars
 The Red Mill (in Clinton, New Jersey)
 Solitude Dam/TISCO Headquarters 1742 in High Bridge, New Jersey
 The Solitude House Museum in High Bridge, New Jersey
 The Taylor Steelworkers Historic Greenway in High Bridge, New Jersey
 Unionville Vineyards

See also

 The Hunterdon County Democrat
 National Register of Historic Places listings in Hunterdon County, New Jersey
 USS Hunterdon County (LST-838)
 Musconetcong County, New Jersey, a proposed county in the 19th Century from parts of Hunterdon and Warren counties

References

External links

 Hunterdon County Official Website
 Map of Hunterdon County
 Hunterdon Land Trust Alliance
 HunterdonCountry.com
 River Ballet Company
 Hunterdon County Obituary Collection
 Hunterdon County Chamber of Commerce Website
 NY-NJTC: Teetertown Ravine Nature Preserve Trail Details and Info
 Hunterdon County Library
 Hunterdon County Alive - Community Website
 Hunterdon Happening Magazine

 
1714 establishments in New Jersey
Central Jersey
Counties in the New York metropolitan area
Populated places established in 1714